This is a list of events in South African sport in 2005.

Cricket

November
 16 November - The Proteas beats India by 5 wickets at the Rajiv Gandhi International Stadium, Uppal, Hyderabad, India in South Africa and India's 1st One Day International of the 2005/6 season.
 19 November - The Proteas loses to the India by 6 wickets in the 2nd One Day International (day/night game) held in M.Chinnaswamy Stadium, Bangalore, India.
 22 November - The 3rd One-Day International in Chennai between the Proteas and the Indian cricket team is abandoned
 25 November - The Proteas beats India by 10 wickets in Kolkata their 4th One-Day International

December
 30 December - The Proteas loses to Australia by 184 runs in the 2nd test held at the Melbourne Cricket Ground

Football (Rugby Union)

April
 30 April - The South African national women's rugby team (Springbok Women’s team)  beat Wales  24 - 9 in Cardiff, Wales

May
 30 April - The South African national women's rugby team (Springbok Women’s team)  lose to England  0 - 101 in Twickenham, England

June
 11 June - South Africa (Springboks) set a massive record-breaking victory against the Uruguay 134-3 in East London
 18 June - The Springboks drew 30-30 with France (les Tricolores) in Durban
 25 June - The Springboks clinches the series 2-0 by beating les Tricolores 27-13 in Port Elizabeth

July
 9 July - The Springboks loses against Australia (Wallabies) 30-12 in the first match of the Mandela Challenge held in Sydney
 23 July - The Springboks beat the Wallabies 33-20 to retain the Mandela Challenge Plate in the second leg test in Johannesburg
 30 July - The Springboks beat the Wallabies 22-16 in the first Tri Nations Series match in Pretoria

August
 6 August - The Springboks beat New Zealand (All Blacks) 22-16 in the Tri Nations Series match at Newlands Cape Town
 20 August - The Springboks beat the Wallabies 22-19 in the Tri Nations Series match at Perth, Australia
 27 August - The Springboks loses to the All Blacks 27-31 in the Tri Nations Series match at Carisbrook, Dunedin, New Zealand

November
 5 November - The Springboks beat Argentina (los Pumas) 34-23 in Buenos Aires
 19 November - The Springboks beat the Wales (The Dragons) 33-16 in Cardiff

Football (Soccer)

February
 9 February - Bafana Bafana draws 1-1 to Australia in a friendly match
 26 February - Bafana Bafana beats Seychelles 3-0 in the opening round of the COSAFA Cup in Mauritius
 27 February - Bafana Bafana beats Mauritius 1-0 in the COSAFA Cup in Mauritius

March
 26 March - Bafana Bafana beats Uganda 2-1 in the World Cup qualifiers

June
 4 June - Bafana Bafana beats the Cape Verde Islands 2-1 in the 2006 World Cup qualifiers
 18 June - Bafana Bafana loses 0-2 to Ghana in the 2006 World Cup qualifiers at the FNB Stadium in Johannesburg

July
 7 July - Bafana Bafana beats Mexico 2-1 during the 2005 CONCACAF Gold Cup in the Carson, California
 10 July - Bafana Bafana draws 3-3 with Jamaica during the 2005 CONCACAF Gold Cup in Los Angeles, California
 13 July - Bafana Bafana draws 1-1 with Guatemala during the 2005 CONCACAF Gold Cup
 17 July - Bafana Bafana drew 1-1 with Panama in Houston, Texas but loses due to 3-5 penalties and is out of the running in the 2005 CONCACAF Gold Cup

August
 13 August - Bafana Bafana loses 8-9 in a shootout to Zambia kicking them out of the COSAFA Cup
 17 August - Bafana Bafana loses 1-4 in a friendly match against Iceland

September
 3 September - Bafana Bafana loses to Burkina Faso 3-1 in the 2006 World Cup qualifiers
 7 September - Bafana Bafana loses to Germany 4-2 in a friendly match

October
 8 October - Bafana Bafana draws with Democratic Republic of Congo (The Simbas) 2-2 in the 2006 World Cup qualifiers

November
 12 November - Bafana Bafana loses 2-3 in the Nelson Mandela Challenge against Senegal held in Port Elizabeth

Golf
 2 May - Ernie Els wins the Asian Open held in Shanghai
 4–7 August - Retief Goosen wins The International (a PGA Tour golf tournament) held at the Castle Pines Golf Course, Castle Rock, Colorado
 25–27 November - Vincent Tshabalala and Tim Clark wins the Nelson Mandela Invitational held at Arabella Country Estate near Hermanus
 18 December - Retief Goosen wins the South African Airways Open

Motorsport
 25 September - A1 Team South Africa finishes 24th (last) in the sprint race and 6th in the main race of the British A1 Grand Prix of Nations held at the Brands Hatch, placing them 8th at the start of the 2005–06 A1 Grand Prix season
 9 October - A1 Team South Africa finishes 12th in the sprint race and 22nd in the main race of the German A1 Grand Prix of Nations held at the Euro Speedway, dropping them to 14th place
 23 October - A1 Team South Africa finishes 10th in the sprint race and 22nd in the main race of the Portuguese A1 Grand Prix of Nations held at the Autódromo do Estoril, dropping them to share 16th place with A1 Team Japan
 6 November - A1 Team South Africa finishes 21st in the sprint race and 24th in the main race of the Australian A1 Grand Prix of Nations held at the Eastern Creek Raceway, stay in 16th place with the A1 Team Japan
 20 November - A1 Team South Africa finishes 21st in the sprint race and 12th in the main race of the Malaysian A1 Grand Prix of Nations held at the Sepang International Circuit, dropping them to share 17th place with the A1 Team Japan
 11 December - A1 Team South Africa finishes 12th in the sprint race and 3rd in the main race of the United Arab Emirates A1 Grand Prix of Nations held at the Dubai Autodrome, climbing to 15th place overall in the 2005/6 season

Swimming
 24 July - Roland Schoeman sets a new world record in the men's 50-metre butterfly during the semi-finals at the 2005 World Aquatics Championships in Montreal, Quebec, Canada
 25 July - Roland Schoeman wins gold and breaks his own world record in the men's 50-metre butterfly final at the World Aquatics Championships in Montreal, Quebec, Canada
 30 July - Roland Schoeman wins his second gold in the men's 50-metre Freestyle swimming final at the World Aquatics Championships in Montreal, Quebec, Canada

See also
2004 in South African sport, 
2005 in South Africa, 
2006 in South African sport and the 
List of years in South African sport